"Hermanita" is a song recorded by bachata group Aventura. It served as the group's main single from their third studio album Love & Hate. The song reached big recognition in many Spanish-speaking countries and reached number thirty-three on the Billboard Latin Songs chart while peaking at number three on the Billboard Tropical Songs chart. It also peaked at number twelve in Switzerland and remained charted for twenty-four weeks. This is Aventura's second real-life situation song.

Music video
The music video for "Hermanita" is about Romeo's older sister whose husband abuses her physically and emotionally and "Romeo" shows up to help her after she calls him. She ends up murdering her husband with the gun her brother gave her (Romeo).

Charts

Weekly charts

Year-end charts

References

2004 singles
Aventura (band) songs
Songs written by Romeo Santos
2003 songs
Songs about domestic violence